Jean Edmond Dujardin (born 19 June 1972) is a French actor and comedian. He began his career as a stand-up comedian in Paris before guest starring in comedic television programmes and films. He first came to prominence with the cult TV series Un gars, une fille, in which he starred alongside his partner Alexandra Lamy, before gaining success in film with movies such as Brice de Nice, Michel Hazanavicius's OSS 117: Cairo, Nest of Spies and its sequel OSS 117: Lost in Rio, as well as 99 Francs.

Dujardin garnered international fame and widespread acclaim with his performance of George Valentin in the 2011 award-winning silent movie The Artist. The role won him numerous awards, including the Academy Award for Best Actor (the first for a French actor), the Golden Globe Award for Best Actor – Motion Picture Musical or Comedy, the BAFTA Award for Best Actor in a Leading Role, the Screen Actors Guild Award for Outstanding Performance by a Male Actor in a Leading Role and the Cannes Film Festival Best Actor. He later appeared in Martin Scorsese's 2013 black comedy The Wolf of Wall Street and George Clooney's 2014 historical drama, The Monuments Men.

Early life
Jean Dujardin was born on 19 June 1972 in Paris and raised in Rueil-Malmaison, Hauts-de-Seine, Île-de-France, a commune in the western suburbs of Paris. After attending high school, he went to work for the construction company of his father, Jacques Dujardin. Dujardin began contemplating a career in acting while serving his mandatory military service a few years later.

Career
Jean Dujardin began his acting career performing a self-written one-man show in various bars and cabarets in Paris. He first gained attention when he appeared on the French talent show Graines de star in 1996 as part of the comedy group Nous Ç Nous, which was formed by members of the Carré blanc theater.

From 1999 to 2003, Dujardin starred in the France production of the originally Canadian comedy series Un gars, une fille, alongside his future wife Alexandra Lamy, before transitioning to a career in film. The TV series charted the path of a relationship; each episode was less than ten minutes long. In 2005, he portrayed the titular surfer in the popular comedic film Brice de Nice and performed on its accompanying soundtrack.

In 2006, Dujardin starred as racist, sexist secret agent Hubert Bonisseur de La Bath in the comedy OSS 117: Cairo, Nest of Spies, a role which earned him an Etoile D'Or Award and a César Award nomination for Best Actor. The film's success spawned a sequel, OSS 117: Lost in Rio. In 2007, directed by Jan Kounen, he starred in the film 99F (99 francs), a very successful existential parody of an advertising exec, adapted from the eponymous best-seller written by Frédéric Beigbeder. This same year, he ventured in drama for the first time on the silver screen, playing a tortured father and cop in Franck Mancuso's Contre-enquête. In 2009, he appeared in A Man and His Dog alongside screen legend Jean-Paul Belmondo, with whom he has often been compared. In 2010, he starred alongside Albert Dupontel, playing his character's cancer in The Clink of Ice, a French black comedy written and directed by Bertrand Blier.

In 2011, Dujardin starred as movie star George Valentin in the silent film The Artist, reuniting him with OSS 117: Cairo, Nest of Spies director Michel Hazanavicius and his co-star in that film, Bérénice Bejo. The film premiered at the 2011 Cannes Film Festival, where he received the Best Actor Award. His performance garnered much critical acclaim and he received numerous nominations, including the Broadcast Film Critics Association Award for Best Actor and the Screen Actors Guild for Best Actor.

On 15 January 2012, Dujardin won a Golden Globe Award for Best Actor – Motion Picture Musical or Comedy. He later went on to win the Screen Actors Guild for Best Actor, and the BAFTA for Best Actor. He was also nominated for the César award of the best actor but lost it to Omar Sy for his role in the second most ever viewed movie in France Intouchables. Dujardin went on to win the Best Actor award at the 84th Academy Awards. In effect he is the fourth French actor to be nominated for an Oscar and the first to win the Best Actor. Following his Oscar nomination for his role in The Artist, WME agency signed the actor.

French film historian Tim Palmer has analyzed Dujardin's career and rise to success in France, noting how his formative roles were often unredeemable buffoons, very skillful portrayals of childlike men who aggressively and unabashedly reject the responsibilities and compromises of adult life. Dujardin's breakthrough roles as Brice de Nice and OSS 117 exemplified this tendency.

In February 2012, Dujardin appeared in Les Infidèles with co-star and friend Gilles Lellouche. He was invited to join the Academy of Motion Picture Arts and Sciences in June 2012 along with 175 other individuals. In 2013, Dujardin starred in Éric Rochant's Möbius with Cécile de France and Tim Roth.

His second film that year was Martin Scorsese's The Wolf of Wall Street, playing alongside Leonardo DiCaprio, Jonah Hill, Matthew McConaughey, and Kyle Chandler, among others. He appeared in The Monuments Men, directed by George Clooney, and co-starring Clooney, Matt Damon, and Cate Blanchett, and starred in the French film Le Petit Joueur.

In late 2014, La French, was released in Europe and subsequently in the United States in early 2015. He plays a French police magistrate who tries to dismantle the French Connection and bring down the Unione Corse.

Personal life
Dujardin has been married three times and has four children. His first marriage, to Gaëlle Demars, ended in 2003. They have two sons, born in 2000 and 2001. In 2003, he started dating his on-screen partner Alexandra Lamy of the comedy series Un gars, une fille; the two had originally met at the audition, and fell in love while shooting the series. They married in Anduze on 25 July 2009. In November 2013, it was announced that the couple had separated.

He began dating French ice dancer Nathalie Péchalat in 2014 after following her to Japan to watch her perform in the world ice skating championships, and they had a daughter who they named Jeanne, in December 2015.  They married on 19 May 2018 in a small ceremony. Péchalat gave birth to daughter Alice in February 2021

Filmography

Film

Television

Music video
 2005 : "Le Casse de Brice" (directed by J.G. Biggs)
 2016 : "Pour un pote" featuring Bigflo & Oli

References

External links

Oscar contender Dujardin in ad campaign controversy over new film on RFI English

1972 births
Living people
Best Actor Academy Award winners
Best Actor BAFTA Award winners
Best Actor AACTA International Award winners
Best Musical or Comedy Actor Golden Globe (film) winners
Cannes Film Festival Award for Best Actor winners
French male film actors
French comedians
French television directors
People from Rueil-Malmaison
French male television actors
20th-century French male actors
21st-century French male actors
Outstanding Performance by a Male Actor in a Leading Role Screen Actors Guild Award winners
Independent Spirit Award for Best Male Lead winners
French male screenwriters
French screenwriters
French male comedians
French male voice actors
Knights of the Ordre national du Mérite
Chevaliers of the Ordre des Arts et des Lettres